Kenneth Earl Clay (born April 6, 1954) is a former Major League Baseball right-handed pitcher. Following his brief major league career, Clay had several run ins with the law. Most recently, he was sentenced to five years in jail for grand theft for creating a fake sales order at the Sarasota, Florida copy machine office in which he worked.

Drafted by the New York Yankees in the second round of the 1972 Major League Baseball Draft, he soon emerged as one of the top pitching prospects in the Yankees' organization. However, he never lived up to his potential, and was eventually traded away by the Yankees after three seasons in which he went 6–14 with a 4.72 earned run average. Clay's lack of success at the major league level is often cited as the catalyst for Yankees owner George Steinbrenner's desire to build his team through free agency and trades rather than relying upon his own farm system.

Minor leagues
Clay was drafted in the second round of the  draft upon graduation from E. C. Glass High School in Lynchburg, Virginia. He put up respectable numbers in his first five seasons in the Yankees' farm system, going 46–40 with a 3.64 ERA, but was wild. In 726 innings pitched, Clay walked 348 batters. He was called up by the Yankees to relieve some of the burden on manager Billy Martin's overextended pitching staff.

New York Yankees
He joined a team that was tied for first place in the American League East, and eventually won the division by 2.5 games over the Baltimore Orioles and Boston Red Sox. Clay went 0–2 with a 7.73 as a starter, but was far more effective out of the bullpen. He was 2–1 with a 3.40 ERA and one save as a relief pitcher. Oddly, the one loss may have been his best pitching performance of the season. On June 17, Catfish Hunter gave up four first inning home runs against the Boston Red Sox at Fenway Park. He handed the ball to Clay down 4–0 with two outs in the first. Clay held them scoreless through the fourth, allowing the Yankees to tie the score. The Red Sox scored a run in the fifth to hang the L on Clay.

After not making an appearance in the 1977 American League Championship Series, he made appearances in both games the Yankees lost to the Los Angeles Dodgers in the World Series, pitching very effectively in game two.

Heading into Spring training , Clay was one of the top young pitching prospects in the Yankees' organization, along with Jim Beattie and Gil Patterson, hoping to earn a spot on the opening day roster. Each vocalized frustration with the organization when they acquired pitchers Rich Gossage, Andy Messersmith and Rawly Eastwick after the 1977 season believing that it hindered their chances of making the club. In return, Clay received his fair share of criticism from some of the veteran pitchers with the Yankees. Hunter surmised that Clay had a "great arm, great slider, bad brains", and felt that the advice he offered to the young pitcher often went unheeded. Likewise, Sparky Lyle, who won a Cy Young Award in relief, also offered advice to Clay about his tendency to wear his arm out in practice, thus not being 100% for the day's game. George Steinbrenner simply described Clay as a "morning glory", a horse racing term for a horse that performs best in the morning workouts prior to the actual race.

Regardless, with the exception of a 21-day trip to the disabled list, Clay remained on the major league roster the entire season. Clay went 3–4 with a 4.28 ERA during the regular season, but his most memorable performance came in the post-season. The Yankees were leading 4-0 when Clay was called into the first game of the 1978 American League Championship Series against the Kansas City Royals in the sixth inning with one out and the bases loaded. The Royals scored one run on a sacrifice fly by Hal McRae. Clay then retired Al Cowens on a groundout to get out of the inning with just one run scored. He held the Royals hitless the rest of the way to earn the save.

Unfortunately, his success did not carry into the  season. He went 1–7 with a 5.70 ERA, and was relegated to "mop-up duty" by the end of the season (26 of his 32 appearances were in losses). He began the  season assigned to the Yankees' triple A affiliate, the Columbus Clippers. On August 14, he was traded to the Texas Rangers for future Hall of Famer Gaylord Perry.

Later career
Clay stepped into Perry's spot in the Rangers' starting rotation, and went 2–3 with a 4.60 ERA his only season in Texas. He was part of a blockbuster deal during the Winter meetings when he, Richie Zisk, Brian Allard, Rick Auerbach, Jerry Gleaton and minor leaguer Steve Finch were sent to the Seattle Mariners for Larry Cox, Rick Honeycutt, Willie Horton, Mario Mendoza and Leon Roberts.

Clay began the  season in Seattle's starting rotation, but after going 0–3 with an ERA of 7.03, he was moved into the bullpen by Mariners manager Maury Wills. He remained in the bullpen through the first half of the strike shortened season, even after Wills was replaced by Rene Lachemann, but was moved back into the starting rotation when play resumed after the strike. He performed far better, going 2–3 with a 3.64 ERA in ten starts. He failed to make the club the following Spring, and retired rather than trying to latch on with a new team. In , he joined the Senior Professional Baseball Association as a member of the Gold Coast Suns, but never appeared in a game with the team.

Legal issues
He faced up to twenty years in prison on four counts of grand larceny for stealing $30,000 from Jostens Inc., a school ring company for whom he worked. Campbell County, Virginia prosecutors cut a deal with his attorneys that kept him out of prison. Instead, he paid $15,000 restitution to Jostens plus $1,394.64 in court fees, got 1,000 hours of community service, five years supervised probation and a suspended sentence.

In February , Clay stole a car from the Bedford County, Virginia car dealership he worked for, and was sentenced to a year in jail. While serving his time, it was discovered that Clay withheld information about three previous arrests from his probation officers (The grand larceny and two DUIs). An additional three years in the Campbell County jail was tacked onto his sentence.

He used his girlfriend's identity to falsify credit card applications, to lease and insure a  Nissan Pathfinder and to create a checking account from which he forged checks. He was charged with five counts of forgery, five counts of scheming to defraud, nine counts of uttering a forged instrument and four counts of grand theft, and could have been sentenced to more than twenty years in prison had he been convicted on all charges by a jury. Clay agreed to pay back creditors, and Manatee County Circuit Judge Charles Williams sentenced him to fifteen years of probation.

In , Clay began working for the Copy Concept copy machine company. Having only made one sale a month and a half into his employment with the company, he falsified a sales order for a Toshiba e-Studio 3511 Copier that would have landed him a $7,500 commission. He forged the supposed buyer's signature on three documents. The jury convicted him of grand theft after a one-day trial. He had been offered a plea agreement that included six months in the county jail before the trial, however, did not accept it. Prosecutors recommended a prison sentence of three years, however, Circuit Judge Rick De Furia sentenced him to five years in prison citing his past criminal activity. He was released from prison on February 16,  and is back living in Lynchburg, where he was born and raised.

References

External links

, or Baseball Almanac
Venezuelan Winter League

1954 births
Living people
Baseball players from Virginia
Cardenales de Lara players
American expatriate baseball players in Venezuela
Columbus Clippers players
Fort Lauderdale Yankees players
Gold Coast Suns (baseball) players
Johnson City Yankees players
Major League Baseball pitchers
New York Yankees players
Sportspeople from Lynchburg, Virginia
Seattle Mariners players
Syracuse Chiefs players
Texas Rangers players
West Haven Yankees players
American people convicted of fraud
American people convicted of theft
People convicted of forgery
Prisoners and detainees of Virginia